Barnett is both a surname and a masculine given name.

Barnett may also refer to:

Barnett class lifeboat, operated by the RNLI between 1923 and 1989
Barnett effect, magnetisation of spinning objects 
Barnett formula, in UK public expenditure 
Barnett, Georgia, a community in the United States
Barnett, New Brunswick, Canada
Barnett Township (disambiguation), various townships in the United States

See also
Barnet (disambiguation)
Burnett (surname)
Francis-Barnett, a motorcycle manufacturer